Zeltus is a butterfly genus in the family Lycaenidae, the blues. It is monotypic containing the species Zeltus amasa, the fluffy tit, a small butterfly found in Indomalayan realm. The butterfly is found in India, specially the Western Ghats, Sikkim to Assam. It can also be found in Myanmar, Thailand, West Malaysia, Sumatra, Borneo, Java and the Philippines.

Description 
The genus is small, and its wingspan is 28–32 millimeter. It has long fluffy tail (v.1, 13 mm.; v.2, 7 mm), which makes it easily recognizable. The forewing (FW) color of male Zeltus is blackish, and the basal area's color is pale blue. The forewing color of female Zeltus is dark brown. The hindwing (HW) color of the male is pale blue, the color of the apex is black.

Zeltus amasa has false eyes, legs, and antennae on the hindwing, which resembles and diverts attention from its real head. If it is attacked, its starts flying in an unexpected direction.

Habit 
The genus is mostly found at hot, wet forest areas. It flies feebly. The female mostly stays inside deep forest and is rarely seen.

Gallery

See also
List of butterflies of India (Lycaenidae)

References

External links 
 

Butterflies of Asia
Lycaenidae genera
Hypolycaenini
Monotypic butterfly genera